Hydrocorella is a small genus of athecate hydroids in the family Hydractiniidae.

Species
Hydrocorella africana Stechow, 1921
Hydrocorella calcarea (Carter, 1977)
Hydrocorella spinifera (Stechow, 1962)

References

Hydractiniidae
Hydrozoan genera